Caelostomus spurius is a species of ground beetle in the subfamily Pterostichinae. It was described by Peringuey in 1926.

References

Caelostomus
Beetles described in 1926